The 1899 Stanford football team represented Stanford University in the 1899 college football season. With a 2–5–2 record in head coach George Burns's only season at the school, the Stanford football team lost as many games in 1899 as they had in the previous four seasons combined and produced the first losing season in school history. The team played its home games at Stanford, California.

Schedule

References

Stanford
Stanford Cardinal football seasons
Stanford football